Jane Chimaliro (born 29 September 1985) is a Malawian netball player who plays for Malawi in the positions of goal attack or wing attack. She has featured in two World Cup tournaments for Malawi in 2015 and in 2019. She has also competed at the Commonwealth Games on two successive occasions in 2014 and 2018 representing Malawi.

References 

1985 births
Living people
Malawian netball players
Netball players at the 2018 Commonwealth Games
Netball players at the 2014 Commonwealth Games
Commonwealth Games competitors for Malawi
2019 Netball World Cup players
2015 Netball World Cup players